Loftus Street is a major north-south road in the Perth suburbs of  and , connecting London Street with Thomas Street.

History

Loftus Street appears on maps as far back as 1894. In 1926, it was widened to accommodate the increasing number of motorised vehicles.

The section between Vincent Street and Anzac Road was reconstructed in 1927.

Route description
The road proceeds north-easterly as a six lane dual carriageway. After  there is an overpass bridging the Mitchell Freeway, with intersections at each end of the bridge. These are with Graham Farmer Freeway interchange ramps to the east, and Cambridge Street and Leederville Parade to the west. Loftus Street reaches its northern terminus  further north, at its intersection with London Street and Scarborough Beach Road.

There are various community facilities at the corner of Vincent and Loftus Streets, including the City of Vincent's Administration & Civic Centre and public library, the Loftus Recreation Centre, and the Loftus Community Centre.

Major intersections

  Thomas Street (State Route 61) south-west / Railway Parade north-west & south-east
  Graham Farmer Freeway (State Route 8)
  Vincent Street (State Route 72)
  London Street (State Route 61) north / Scarborough Beach Road north-west & south-east

See also

References

Streets in West Perth, Western Australia
Roads in Perth, Western Australia